The Never Ending Tour is the popular name for Bob Dylan's endless touring schedule since June 7, 1988.

Background information
The Never Ending Tour 1998 started in North America with two performances in New London, Connecticut and five concerts at the Madison Square Theatre. Dylan continued to tour the North-East states until the tour came to a close on February 22 in Fairfax, Virginia.

After finishing the North American winter tour, Dylan performed two concerts in Miami, Florida, before flying to South America to support The Rolling Stones as well as performing several South American concerts without them.

Dylan returned to the United States to perform eight concerts with Joni Mitchell and Van Morrison. Shortly after finishing this tour Dylan travelled to Europe to perform a 33 date concert tour with several major festival appearances, including Rock am Ring and Rock im Park, Norwegian Wood Festival, Roskilde Festival and Glastonbury Festival.

In August Dylan travelled to Australia to perform his first tour there since 1992. The tour started off with a performance at the Mercury Lounge. Dylan performed another ten concerts in Australia before travelling to New Zealand, where he performed four concerts, two of which were in Auckland.

After finishing his Oceania tour Dylan flew from Australia to Hawaii. He also performed a further six concerts in the United States all of which were dual concerts with Van Morrison.

In October Dylan toured North America without support from any other major act. He performed seven concerts in Canada and ten in the United States. The tour came to an end on November 7 in Atlanta, Georgia after one hundred and ten concerts.

Shows

References

External links

BobLinks – Comprehensive log of concerts and set lists
Bjorner's Still on the Road – Information on recording sessions and performances

Bob Dylan concert tours
1998 concert tours